Mr. District Attorney is a radio crime drama produced by Samuel Bischoff that aired on NBC and ABC from April 3, 1939 to June 13, 1952 (and in transcribed syndication through 1953). The series focused on a crusading district attorney initially known only as Mister District Attorney or Chief, and was later translated to television. On television the attorney's name was Paul Garrett, and the radio version adopted the name in its final years when David Brian played the role. A key figure in the dramas was secretary Edith Miller.

History
Created, written, and directed by former law student Ed Byron, the series was inspired by the early years of New York governor Thomas E. Dewey. Dewey's public war against racketeering led to his election as governor. Phillips H. Lord, creator of Gang Busters, helped to develop the concept and coined the title. Byron lent an air of accuracy and immediacy to his scripts through close study of crime statistics, a library of criminology texts, following the newspapers and even visiting rough bars to gain tips, background and color from crooks and police.

Produced throughout its run in New York City, the series began as a 15-minute serial, becoming a half-hour, self-contained series three months later as a summer replacement for The Bob Hope Show on June 27, 1939. During 1942, Mr. District Attorney began battling Nazis, leading to conflicts with the FBI when the scripts reflected life too closely.

The program was sponsored by Bristol-Myers.

Cast and characters
 Mr. District Attorney – the nameless title role was played by several actors throughout the series:
 Dwight Weist (1939 serials)
 Raymond Edward Johnson (1939 half-hour shows)
 Jay Jostyn (1940 through 1952; Jostyn also guest-starred in the role in mystery sketches for the game show Quick as a Flash)
 Tony Randall served as a replacement for Jostyn during the 1940s, because, in his words, he performed "a good Jay Jostyn impression".
 David Brian (1952–1953 syndication)
 Voice of the Law – the show's signature was the opening announcer known as the Voice of the Law, who defined the creed and duties of Mr. District Attorney. The role was played by Maurice Franklin and also Jay Jostyn prior to taking the lead role.
 Edith Miller – the district attorney's faithful secretary, played throughout the series run by Vicki Vola.
 Miss Rand – the D.A.'s receptionist was played by Eleanor Silver and Arlene Francis. 
 Len Harrington – the D.A.'s chief investigator, a former cop, was played by Walter Kinsella, who had been heard in various police roles during the early years, and by Len Doyle from 1940 onward.
 Other supporting players and guests on the series included such noted actors as Paul Stewart and Frank Lovejoy.
 Harry Salter conducted the music.

Film
In three films released by Republic Pictures in the early 1940s, the district attorney was named P. Cadwallader Jones and was assisted by journalist Terry Parker. Different actors portrayed them in each film. The trilogy consisted of Mr. District Attorney (1941) starring Dennis O'Keefe with Florence Rice and Peter Lorre, Mr. District Attorney in the Carter Case (1941) starring James Ellison and Virginia Gilmore and Secrets of the Underground (1942) starring John Hubbard and Virginia Grey.

A fourth film again titled Mr. District Attorney was released by Columbia Pictures in 1947. O'Keefe returned as the lead, now named Steve Bennett.

Television

Near the end of the radio run, the series was transferred to television. The first incarnation ran on ABC from October 1, 1951 through June 23, 1952 on alternate Mondays, first with The Amazing Mr. Malone and then Out of the Fog. The radio cast reprised their roles, with Jay Jostyn as Mr. District Attorney, Vicki Vola as Miss Miller and Len Doyle as Harrington.

Season 1 (1951–52)

1954 revival
In 1954, the show was revived in syndication by Ziv Television Programs, which had also handled the 1952–1953 radio syndication. David Brian reprised his role from that series but the D. A. was named Paul Garrett. Jackie Loughery played Miss Miller.

Season 1 (1954)

Season 2 (1955)

Comic books
DC Comics published a Mr. District Attorney comic-book series that ran for 67 issues (January–February 1948 to January–February 1959). In 1941, the Whitman Publishing Company published a Big Little Book, Mr. District Attorney on the Job, that included a flip book.

References

External links
 Can you guess how Mr. District Attorney broke the case of the COP KILLER, a two-page photo story from Radio-TV Mirror, February 1952
 Mr. District Attorney (1951–52) at CVTA
 Mr. District Attorney (1954–55) at CVTA
 
 

1930s American radio programs
1940s American radio programs
1950s American radio programs
1951 American television series debuts
1954 American television series endings
American legal drama television series
ABC radio programs
American Broadcasting Company original programming
American radio dramas
Defunct American comics
NBC Blue Network radio programs
NBC radio programs
Television series based on radio series
Television series by MGM Television
Syndicated radio programs
Ziv Company radio programs
Television series about prosecutors